Murray-Mallee was an electoral district of the House of Assembly in the Australian state of South Australia from 1985 to 1993.

Murray-Mallee was created in a boundary redistribution in 1985, replacing the Electoral district of Mallee. The last member for Mallee, Peter Lewis, became the first representative for Murray-Mallee in December 1985.

Murray-Mallee was abolished in a boundary redistribution in 1993, replaced in part by the Electoral district of Ridley. The member for Murray-Mallee, Peter Lewis, went on to represent Ridley from December 1993.

Member

Election results

References

External links
Former Members of the Parliament of South Australia
1985 & 1989 election boundaries, page 18 & 19

Former electoral districts of South Australia
1985 establishments in Australia
1993 disestablishments in Australia
Constituencies established in 1985
Constituencies disestablished in 1993